The winners of the 1997–98 Asian Cup Winners' Cup, the association football competition run by the Asian Football Confederation, are listed below.

First round

West Asia

|}
1 both matches in UAE

East Asia

|}

1 Both matches played in China, 1st leg at Beijing, 2nd leg at Wenzhou.

Second round

West Asia

|}
1 Al Shabab withdrew 
2 both matches in Qatar

East Asia

|}

Quarterfinals

West Asia

|}

East Asia

|}

Semifinals

Third place match

Final

References
 Asian Cup Winners Cup 1998

 

Asian Cup Winners' Cup
2
2